Merriam Street Bridge is a truss bridge that spans the east channel of the Mississippi River between Nicollet Island and the east bank of the river in Minneapolis, Minnesota.  The bridge was originally built in 1887 by King Iron Bridge Company as one of the four spans of the Broadway Avenue Bridge.  When the Broadway Avenue Bridge was reconstructed in 1987, one span was preserved and moved to Nicollet Island.  The truss span is actually decorative; the bridge is supported by a beam from underneath.

The original Broadway Avenue Bridge was one of the fanciest bridges on the Mississippi River.  It featured finials on each top corner and a band of scrolls, crosses, and lines between them. The horizontal struts and guard railings used X-shapes as a pattern.  Each end of the bridge has a hexagonal cast iron plate embossed with the date and the designer of the bridge.  The bridge now serves as a connector between parkland on Nicollet Island and the Saint Anthony Main development on the east bank, allowing good opportunities for visitors to stroll across the river.

Gallery

References
 

Truss bridges in the United States
Bridges in Minneapolis
Bridges over the Mississippi River
Bridges completed in 1887
Road bridges in Minnesota
King Bridge Company
Relocated buildings and structures in Minnesota
Metal bridges in the United States